Duke of Atholl, named for Atholl in Scotland, is a title in the Peerage of Scotland held by the head of Clan Murray. It was created by Queen Anne in 1703 for John Murray, 2nd Marquess of Atholl, with a special remainder to the heir male of his father, the 1st Marquess.

, there were twelve subsidiary titles attached to the dukedom: Lord Murray of Tullibardine (1604), Lord Murray, Gask and Balquhidder (1628), Lord Murray, Balvany and Gask (1676), Lord Murray, Balvenie and Gask, in the County of Perth (1703), Viscount of Balquhidder (1676), Viscount of Balquhidder, Glenalmond and Glenlyon, in the County of Perth (1703), Earl of Atholl (1629), Earl of Tullibardine (1628), Earl of Tullibardine (1676), Earl of Strathtay and Strathardle, in the County of Perth (1703), Marquess of Atholl (1676) and Marquess of Tullibardine, in the County of Perth (1703). These titles are also in the Peerage of Scotland. The dukes have also previously held the following titles: Baron Strange (Peerage of England 1628) between 1736 and 1764 and 1805 and 1957; Baron Murray, of Stanley in the County of Gloucester, and Earl Strange (Peerage of Great Britain 1786) between 1786 and 1957, Baron Glenlyon, of Glenlyon in the County of Perth (Peerage of the United Kingdom 1821) between 1846 and 1957 and Baron Percy (Peerage of Great Britain 1722) between 1865 and 1957. From 1786 to 1957 the Dukes of Atholl sat in the House of Lords as Earl Strange.

The Duke's eldest son and heir apparent uses the courtesy title Marquess of Tullibardine. The heir apparent to Lord Tullibardine uses the courtesy title Earl of Strathtay and Strathardle (usually shortened to Earl of Strathtay). Lord Strathtay's heir apparent uses the courtesy title Viscount Balquhidder. The Duke of Atholl is the hereditary chief of Clan Murray.

Family history

The Dukes of Atholl belong to an ancient Scottish family. Sir William Murray of Castleton married Lady Margaret, daughter of John Stewart, 1st Earl of Atholl (see Earl of Atholl). Sir William was one of the many Scottish noblemen killed at the Battle of Flodden in 1513. His son Sir William Murray lived at Tullibardine in Perthshire. The latter's grandson, Sir John Murray, was created Lord Murray of Tullibardine in 1604 and Lord Murray, Gask and Balquhidder and Earl of Tullibardine in 1606. All three titles were in the Peerage of Scotland. He was succeeded by his eldest son, William Murray (1574–1628), the second Earl of Tullibardine. He married as his third wife Lady Dorothea, daughter of John Stewart, 5th and last Earl of Atholl. Charles I agreed to revive the earldom of Atholl in favour of Lord Tullibardine's children by Lady Dorothea. Tullibardine consequently resigned his titles in favour of his younger brother, Patrick Murray, who was created Lord Murray of Gask and Earl of Tullibardine in 1628, with remainder to his heirs male whatsoever and presumably with the precedence of 1606. John Murray, son of the second Earl of Tullibardine by Lady Dorothea Stewart, was created Earl of Atholl in the Peerage of Scotland in 1629. He was succeeded by his son, the second Earl of Atholl. In 1670 he succeeded his cousin James Murray, 2nd Earl of Tullibardine, as third (or fifth) Earl of Tullibardine. In 1676 he was created Lord Murray, Balveny and Gask, Viscount of Balquhidder, Earl of Tullibardine and Marquess of Atholl, with remainder to the heirs male of his body. All titles were in the Peerage of Scotland. Lord Atholl married Lady Amelia Anne Sophia, daughter of James Stanley, 7th Earl of Derby (and 1st Baron Strange).

On his death the titles passed to his eldest son, the second Marquess. He had already been created Lord Murray, Viscount Glenalmond and Earl of Tullibardine for life in the peerage of Scotland in 1696. In 1703 he was made Lord Murray, Balvenie and Gask, in the County of Perth, Viscount of Balwhidder, Glenalmond and Glenlyon, in the County of Perth, Earl of Strathtay and Strathardle, in the County of Perth, Marquess of Tullibardine, in the County of Perth, and Duke of Atholl, with remainder failing heirs male of his own to the heirs male of his father. All five titles were in the Peerage of Scotland. His eldest surviving son and heir apparent, William Murray, Marquess of Tullibardine, took part in the Jacobite rising of 1715. He was charged with high treason and attainted by Act of Parliament. An Act of Parliament was also passed to remove him from the succession to his father's titles. William was, on 1 February 1717, created Duke of Rannoch, Marquis of Blair, Earl of Glen Tilt, Viscount of Glenshie, and Lord Strathbran in the Jacobite Peerage. The first Duke was consequently succeeded by his third son, James, the second Duke. In 1736 he also succeeded his kinsman James Stanley, 10th Earl of Derby as 7th Baron Strange and as Lord of Mann. On the death of his brother William in 1746, he succeeded to the Jacobite titles, such as they were. The Duke's two sons both died in infancy. His eldest daughter Lady Charlotte succeeded him in the barony of Strange and the lordship of Mann. Atholl died in 1764 and was succeeded in the dukedom and remaining titles by his nephew, John, the third Duke. He was the eldest son of Lt-Gen Lord George Murray, sixth son of the first Duke (who had been attainted for his participation in the Jacobite Rebellion of 1715), the same year he succeeded the House of Lords decided that he should be allowed to succeed in the titles despite his father's attainder. He married his first cousin, the aforementioned Charlotte Murray, Baroness Strange. They sold their sovereignty over the Isle of Man to the British Crown for £70,000.

The Duke and Duchess were both succeeded by their eldest son John, the fourth Duke. In 1786 he was created Baron Murray, of Stanley in the County of Gloucester, and Earl Strange in the Peerage of Great Britain. These titles gave him a seat in the House of Lords. Atholl sold his remaining properties and privileges in the Isle of Man to the British Crown for £409,000. He was succeeded on his death in 1829 by his eldest son, John, the fifth Duke. He had already in 1798 been declared to have been of an "unsound mind". The fifth Duke never married and was succeeded by his nephew, George Murray, 2nd Baron Glenlyon, the eldest son of James Murray, 1st Baron Glenlyon, second son of the fourth Duke, who had been created Baron Glenlyon, of Glenlyon in the County of Perth, in the Peerage of the United Kingdom in 1821. Lord Glenlyon married Lady Emily Frances Percy, daughter of Hugh Percy, 2nd Duke of Northumberland and 3rd Baron Percy.

The sixth Duke was succeeded by his only child, John, the seventh Duke. In 1865 he succeeded as sixth Baron Percy through his grandmother aforesaid. The same year he registered the additional surname of Stewart at the Lyon Court. In 1893 he resumed the original spelling of the title, "Atholl" instead of "Athole". He was succeeded by his second but eldest surviving son, John, the eighth Duke, who died childless in 1942 and was succeeded by his youngest brother, James, the ninth Duke. James never married, and on his death in 1957 the baronies of Murray and Glenlyon and earldom of Strange became extinct, the barony of Percy was passed on to his kinsman Hugh Percy, 10th Duke of Northumberland, while the barony of Strange fell into abeyance (see Baron Strange).

The dukedom of Atholl and remaining titles were passed on to the late Duke's fourth cousin twice removed, Iain Murray, the tenth Duke of Atholl. He was the grandson of Sir Evelyn Murray, son of Sir George Murray, grandson of Dr George Murray, Bishop of Rochester, son of Bishop Lord George Murray, second son of the third Duke. As all the English titles had become extinct on the ninth Duke's death, the tenth Duke was not entitled to an automatic seat in the House of Lords, gaining in 1957 the then unfortunate distinction of being the highest ranking peer without a seat in the upper chamber of parliament. However, in 1958 Atholl was elected a Scottish Representative Peer and was able to take a seat in the House of Lords. Through the Peerage Act 1963 all hereditary Scottish peers gained the right to sit in the House of Lords. The tenth Duke was unmarried and was succeeded in 1996 by his second cousin once removed, John Murray, 11th Duke of Atholl. He was the grandson of the Rev. Douglas Stuart Murray, brother of the aforementioned Sir George Murray, great-grandfather of the tenth Duke. On his death in 2012, the eleventh Duke was succeeded by his eldest son, Bruce Murray, 12th Duke of Atholl.

Other family members

Mungo Murray, second son of the first Earl of Tullibardine of the first creation, succeeded as second Viscount of Stormont according to a special remainder in 1631, but died childless in 1642. Lord Charles Murray, second son of the first Marquess, was created Earl of Dunmore in 1686. Lord James Murray, third son of the first Marquess, was Member of Parliament for Perthshire. Lord William Murray, fourth son of the first Marquess, succeeded his father-in-law as Lord Nairne in 1683 but was attainted for taking part in the Jacobite Rising of 1715. Lord George Murray, fifth son of the first Duke and father of the third Duke, was a prominent Jacobite general. He was also the father of James Murray, a soldier and politician, and George Murray, a naval commander and politician. Lord John Murray, eighth son of the first Duke (and the eldest by his second wife), was a soldier and politician. Lord George Murray, second son of the third Duke, was Bishop of St David's. His eldest son George Murray was Bishop of Rochester. His fourth son Sir Herbert Harley Murray was Governor of Newfoundland. The actor Stephen Murray and diplomat Sir Ralph Murray were the grandsons of the Rev. Francis William Murray, son of George Murray, Bishop of Rochester. Comedian and prospective parliamentary candidate Al Murray is the grandson of former British Ambassador Sir Ralph Hay Murray.

James Arthur Murray (1790–1860), only son of Lord William Murray, third son of the third Duke, was a vice-admiral in the Royal Navy. Lord Charles Murray-Aynsley, fifth son of the third Duke, was a clergyman. His son John Murray-Aynsley was the father of 1) Charles Murray-Aynsley (1821–1901), a vice-admiral in the Royal Navy; 2) George Herbert Murray-Aynsley (1826–1887), a Major-General in the Madras Army, and 3) Hugh Murray-Aynsley, a New Zealand politician. Sir George Murray, son of the Rev. George Edward Murray, son of George Murray, Bishop of Rochester, was a civil servant. His son Sir Evelyn Murray was Secretary to the General Post Office between 1914 and 1934. Lord James Murray, second son of the fourth Duke, was a soldier and politician and was created Baron Glenlyon in 1821. Anne, Duchess of Atholl, VA, wife of the sixth Duke, was Mistress of the Robes to Queen Victoria. Dame Kitty Stewart-Murray, DBE, MP, wife of the eighth Duke, was Parliamentary Secretary to the Board of Education from 1924 to 1929, the first woman to serve in a Conservative and Unionist government.

Traditional residence and military command
The Dukes of Atholl's traditional residence is Blair Castle, though the family has owned several other residences and castles in the past, notably Huntingtower Castle, Balvenie Castle, Tullibardine Castle and Dunkeld House (the latter two demolished).

The traditional burial place of the Dukes of Atholl is the Family Burial Ground (photo) next to the ruins of St Bride's Kirk in the grounds of Blair Castle. The ruin stands on a mound a little to the north-east of the castle, where a church has existed since at least 1134. St Bride's was the village church of Old Blair but fell into disuse after 1823 when the estate village was relocated to its current location.

The holder of the dukedom of Atholl also commands the only legal private army in Europe, the Atholl Highlanders, which is headquartered at Blair Castle.

Earls of Tullibardine; first creation (1606)

John Murray, 1st Earl of Tullibardine (died 1609)
William Murray, 2nd Earl of Tullibardine (c. 1574–1626) (eldest son of the 1st Earl; resigned his titles in favour of younger brother in 1626)

Earls of Tullibardine; second creation (1628)
Patrick Murray, 1st Earl of Tullibardine (1578–1644) (third son of the 1st Earl of Tullibardine of the first creation)
James Murray, 2nd Earl of Tullibardine (1617–1670) (eldest son of the 1st Earl; died without surviving children)
Patrick Murray, Lord Murray and Gask (c. 1644–c. 1661–1664) (elder son of the 2nd Earl, died unmarried)
James Murray, Lord Murray and Gask (c. 1652–c. 1664–1670) (younger son of the 2nd Earl, died young)
John Murray, 3rd Earl of Tullibardine (1631–1703) (first cousin of the 2nd Earl; became 2nd Earl of Atholl in 1642 and created Marquess of Atholl in 1676)

Earls of Atholl; tenth creation (1629)
John Murray, 1st Earl of Atholl (died 1642) (son of the 2nd Earl of Tullibardine of the first creation)
John Murray, 3rd Earl of Tullibardine, 2nd Earl of Atholl (1631–1703) (elder son of the 1st Earl; created Marquess of Atholl in 1676)

Marquesses of Atholl (1676)
John Murray, 1st Marquess of Atholl (1631–1703) (elder son of the 1st Earl)
John Murray, 2nd Marquess of Atholl (1660–1724) (eldest son of the 1st Marquess; created Duke of Atholl in 1703)

Dukes of Atholl (1703)
Other titles: Marquess of Tullibardine, Earl of Strathtay and Strathardle, Viscount of Balwhidder, Glenalmond and Glenlyonz and Lord Murray, Balvenie and Gask (Scotland, 1703); Marquess of Atholl, Earl of Tullibardine, Viscount of Balquhidder and Lord Murray, Balvany and Gask (Scotland, 1676); Earl of Atholl (Scotland, 1629); Earl of Tullibardine and Lord Murray, Gask and Balquhidder (Scotland, 1628); Lord Murray of Tullibardine (Scotland, 1604)
John Murray, 1st Duke of Atholl (1660–1724) (eldest son of the 1st Marquess)
John Murray, Marquess of Tullibardine (1684–1709) (eldest son of the 1st Duke; died unmarried)
William Murray, Marquess of Tullibardine (1689–1746) (second son of the 1st Duke; was a Jacobite who was attainted and executed, unmarried, for treason; excluded from the succession)
Lord Charles Murray (1691–1720) (fourth son of the 1st Duke; predeceased his third brother without issue)
Lt.-Gen. Lord George Murray (1694–1760) fifth son of the 1st Duke, also attainted 
Other titles (2nd and 4th through 9th Dukes): Baron Strange (England, 1628)
James Murray, 2nd Duke of Atholl (1690–1764) (third son of the 1st Duke)
John Murray, Marquess of Tullibardine (1728–1729) (eldest son of the 2nd Duke; died in infancy)
James Murray, Marquess of Tullibardine (1735–1736) (second and youngest son of the 2nd Duke; died in infancy)
John Murray, 3rd Duke of Atholl (1729–1774) (only son of Lord George Murray, attainted fifth son of the 1st Duke)
John Murray, 4th Duke of Atholl (1755–1830) (eldest son of the 3rd Duke)
John Murray, 5th Duke of Atholl (1778–1846) (eldest son of the 4th Duke; died unmarried)
Other titles (6th through 9th Dukes): Earl Strange and Baron Murray (Great Britain, 1786, extinct 1957); Baron Glenlyon (United Kingdom, 1821, extinct 1957)
George Augustus Frederick John Murray, 6th Duke of Atholl (1814–1864) (eldest son of James Murray, 1st Baron Glenlyon; see below)
Other titles (7th through 9th Dukes): Baron Percy (Great Britain, 1722)
John James Hugh Henry Stewart-Murray, 7th Duke of Atholl (1840–1917) (only son of the 6th Duke)
John Stewart-Murray, Marquess of Tullibardine (1869–1869) (eldest son of the 7th Duke; died in infancy)
Major Lord George Stewart-Murray (1873–1914) (third son of the 7th Duke; predeceased his second brother without issue)
John George Stewart-Murray, 8th Duke of Atholl (1871–1942) (second son of the 7th Duke; died without issue)
James Stewart-Murray, 9th Duke of Atholl (1879–1957) (fourth and youngest son of the 7th Duke; died unmarried)
George Iain Murray, 10th Duke of Atholl (1931–1996) (fourth cousin, twice removed of the 9th Duke; great-great-great-grandson of Rt. Rev. Dr. George Murray, eldest son of Rt. Rev. Lord George Murray, second son of the 3rd Duke; died unmarried)
John Murray, 11th Duke of Atholl (1929–2012) (second cousin, once removed of the 10th Duke; great-great grandson of Rt. Rev. George Murray, eldest son of Rt. Rev. Lord George Murray, second son of the 3rd Duke)
Bruce George Ronald Murray, 12th Duke of Atholl (born 1960) (elder son of the 11th Duke)

The heir apparent is the present holder's elder son, Michael Bruce John Murray, Marquess of Tullibardine (born 1985).

Barons Glenlyon (1821)
James Murray, 1st Baron Glenlyon (1782–1837), second son of the 4th Duke
George Augustus Frederick John Murray, 2nd Baron Glenlyon (1814–1864) (succeeded as 6th Duke of Atholl in 1846)
see above for further succession

 John Murray, 1st Marquess of Atholl (1631–1703)
 John Murray, 1st Duke of Atholl (1660–1724)
 James Murray, 2nd Duke of Atholl (1690–1764)
Lord George Murray (1694–1760)
 John Murray, 3rd Duke of Atholl (1729–1774)
The Rt Rev. Lord George Murray (1761–1803)
The Rt. Rev. George Murray (1784–1860)
Rev. George Edward Murray (1818–1854)
Rev. Douglas Stuart Murray (1853–1920)
George Murray (1884–1940)
 John Murray, 11th Duke of Atholl (1929–2012)
 Bruce Murray, 12th Duke of Atholl (b. 1960)
(1) Michael Bruce John Murray, Marquess of Tullibardine (b. 1985)
(2) Lord David Nicholas George Murray (b. 1986)
(3) Lord Craig John Murray (b. 1963)
(4) Carl Murray (b. 1994)
Sir Herbert Murray (1829–1904)Gerald Ottway Hay Murray (1868–1951)Douglas Gerald Murray (1907-1980)male issue in lineStewart Hay Murray (1909–1988)John Stewart Murray (1940–2000)male issue in line
Peter Gerald Stewart Murray (b. 1944)
male issue in lineKeith Robert Murray (1912-1997)male issue in lineRev. Frederick William Murray (1831–1913)Rev. Frederick Auriol Murray-Gourlay, 25th of Kincraig (1865–1939)George Ronald Auriol Murray-Gourlay, 26th of Kincraig (1900–1961)Brian Austin Walter Murray-Gourlay, 27th of Kincraig (1927–1996)Hugh William Auriol Murray-Gourlay (b. 1960)Rev. Charles Hay Murray (1869-1923)Sir Francis Ralph Hay Murray (1908–1983)Ingram Bernard Hay Murray (b. 1937)
Al Murray (b. 1968)
male issue in lineRev. Edward Murray (1798–1852)
Charles Edward Gostling Murray (1825–1892)
Rupert Murray (1882–1915)
Anthony Ian Rupert Murray (1914–1993)
male issue in line
Stracey Montagu Atholl Murray (1888–1970)
male issue in line
Fane Robert Conant Murray (1929–2014)
male issue in line
Lord Henry Murray (1767–1805)
Richard Murray (1787–1843)
Henry Murray (1815–1864)
Rev. Arthur Silver Murray (1858–1932)
Arthur Evelyn Francis Murray (1888–1972)
male issue in line
Douglas Vivian Murray (1905–1976)
male issue in line
Very Rev. Lord Charles Murray-Aynsley (1771–1808)
John Murray-Aynsley (1795–1870)
Hugh Percy Murray-Aynsley (1828–1917)
Charles Percy Murray-Aynsley (1862–1936)
Francis Percy Murray-Aynsley (1924–1991)
male issue in line
 Charles Murray, 1st Earl of Dunmore (1661–1710)
Earls of Dunmore, by special remainder to the Dukedom

Coat of arms

Heraldry

Family tree

See also
Clan Murray
Murray (surname)
Earl of Dunmore
Atholl
Atholl Highlanders
Atolovo, a Bulgarian village named after the eighth Duke

Notes

References
 

 Anderson, Alan Orr, Early Sources of Scottish History: AD 500–1286, 2 Vols, (Edinburgh, 1922)
Kidd, Charles, Williamson, David (editors). Debrett's Peerage and Baronetage (1990 edition). New York: St Martin's Press, 1990, 
 Roberts, John L., Lost Kingdoms: Celtic Scotland in the Middle Ages, (Edinburgh, 1997)

External links
 Cracroft's Peerage page
 European Heraldry page (archived page)
 Murray Clan Society of North America

Dukedoms in the Peerage of Scotland
History of the Scottish Highlands
Perth and Kinross
1703 establishments in Scotland
Noble titles created in 1703
Duke